The Manila Bulletin (also known as the Bulletin and previously known as the Manila Daily Bulletin from 1906 to September 23, 1972, and the Bulletin Today from November 22, 1972, to March 10, 1986) is the Philippines' largest English language broadsheet newspaper by circulation. Founded in 1900, it is the second oldest extant newspaper published in the Philippines and the second oldest extant English newspaper in the Far East. It bills itself as "The Nation's Leading Newspaper", which is its official slogan. 

According to a survey done by the Reuters Institute for the Study of Journalism, Manila Bulletin is considered "one of the most trusted news organizations"; placing 2nd with 66% of Filipinos trusting the organization.

History

Manila Bulletin was founded in 1900 by Carlson Taylor as a shipping journal. In 1957, the newspaper was acquired by Swiss expatriate named Hans Menzi.

From 1938 to his death in 2002, Jose Guevara wrote a column of political commentary for the newspaper. 

On occasion the editorial policy of the Manila Bulletin has met objection from civil authorities. During World War II the newspaper's editor, Roy Anthony Cutaran Bennett, was imprisoned and tortured by the Japanese for his statements opposing the militarist expansion of the Japanese Empire. The Manila Bulletin (as Bulletin Today from 1972 to 1986) survived the martial law era of President Ferdinand Marcos as a propaganda tool.

Following the Menzi's death in 1984, Chinese Filipino business mogul Emilio Yap became the new chairman of the Bulletin. Yap was invited by Menzi to become a shareholder in 1961.  The company has been listed on the Philippine Stock Exchange since 1990, and had revenues of approximately US$45 million in 2004. Besides its flagship it publishes two other daily tabloids, Tempo and Balita, as well as nine magazines such as the Philippine Panorama, Bannawag, Liwayway, Bisaya and a host of other journals in English, Tagalog, Cebuano and other Philippine languages. It also publishes a number of lifestyle magazines such as Wedding Essentials, Style Weekend, GARAGE Magazine, Agriculture Magazine, Digital Gen, Going Places and Animal Scene.

In May 2021, The Manila Bulletin named Business Editor Loreto Cabanes as the new editor-in-chief following the passing of Dr. Crispulo Icban. Herminio "Sonny" B. Coloma was also named as the new publisher.

The company holds two sister papers Tempo (in English and Tagalog) and Balita (in Tagalog). To further enhance its image as a newspaper which presents positive news articles, the Bulletin recently introduced a new marketing tagline, "There's good news here". In 2015, they adopted the marketing tagline "Be Fully Informed" which is still being used to this day.

In addition, it maintains the oldest news website in the Philippines. To date, it is the largest subscriber to the Philippine News Agency among newspapers.

MB Online Chinese edition

In June 2020, Manila Bulletin unveiled its Chinese-language online edition, thus becoming the first major Philippine print news outlet to have an online Chinese edition that would cater to the Chinese Filipino population and the Chinese diaspora in the Philippines.

Reception
On December 22, 2007, survey results by Nielsen Media Research's Nielsen Media Index Study (Enhanced Wave 2), covering the whole year of 2007, showed that the Manila Bulletin was the choice of 47 "of those who said they had read a broadsheet" with 1.17 million readers. This was lower than rivals Philippine Daily Inquirer (53% with 1.3 million readers), and higher than The Philippine Star (42% or 1.05 million readers). Nielsen survey also showed that the Panorama came in second with 35% readership, below Sunday Inquirer Magazine (39% readership), and above Starweek (12%).

Latest Q2 2016 Nielsen Consumer and Media View results put Manila Bulletin, with 48% share of the total Broadsheet market, as the most read Broadsheet in the Philippines. Philippine Daily Inquirer comes in second at 38%, followed by Philippine Star at 14%.

Results from the global survey 2020 Digital News Report, an annual project of the Reuters Institute for the Study of Journalism at Oxford University, revealed that Manila Bulletin, together with The Philippine Star and TV5, was the second most trusted brand at 68%, behind only GMA Network's 73%.

Controversy
On June 5, 2008, a Filipino blogger sued the Bulletin for copyright infringement. The photo blogger had discovered that photos that he had taken and posted online had been used by the Manila Bulletin in the  "Travel & Tourism" section of its March 21, 2007, issue. Apparently, the photographs had been altered and used by the newspaper without the original photographer's consent and without attribution or compensation. A month later, the newspaper filed a counter-suit against the blogger claiming "exemplary and moral damages". The Manila Bulletin claimed that its use (and alteration, creating derivative works) of the photographs constituted fair use.

Manila Bulletin Publishing Corp. Group

Tabloids
Tempo
Balita

Magazines

Showbiz
Bannawag
Bisaya Magasin
Hiligaynon Magazine
Liwayway

Sports
Sports Digest

Lifestyle
Animal Scene
Going Places (previously known as Cruising)
Philippine Panorama (sometimes simply known as Panorama)
The Digital Generation
Agriculture
Wedding Essentials
Garage
Crosstrain.PH

Online Properties
Manila Bulletin Internet Edition
Manila Bulletin Chinese Edition

See also
Life in Progress

References

External links
 
 Media Ownership Monitor Philippines - Media Companies: A Duopoly Rules by VERA Files and Reporters Without Borders
 Media Ownership Monitor Philippines - Print by VERA Files and Reporters Without Borders

 
English-language newspapers published in the Philippines
National newspapers published in the Philippines
Newspapers published in Metro Manila
Newspapers established in 1900
Companies listed on the Philippine Stock Exchange
1900 establishments in the Philippines